George Shell may refer to:

 George W. Shell (1831–1899), U.S. Representative from South Carolina
 George R. E. Shell (1908–1996), United States Marine Corps general